Lake Kauru is a lake in Estonia.

See also
List of lakes of Estonia

Kauru
Otepää Parish
Kauru